Ivana Vuleta (born 10 May 1990) is a Serbian long jumper, two-time World indoor champion, two-time European champion, three-time European indoor champion and four-time Diamond League Trophy Winner.

In 2013, Vuleta became the first Serbian track and field athlete to win a medal at the IAAF Outdoor World Championships. In 2018, she became the first Serbian track and field athlete to win a world senior gold medal at the IAAF Indoor World Championships. She is the Serbian record holder in the long jump, indoors and outdoors, and also she is the national indoor record holder in the 60 metres and in the pentathlon. Her coach is Goran Obradović and she is a member of the Vojvodina Athletic Club, based in Novi Sad.

Career
Španović earned gold medals at the 2008 World Junior Championships and the 2009 Summer Universiade. She was selected as Serbia's Best Young Athlete of 2008. She also won silver medals at the 2007 World Youth Championships, the 2009 European Junior Championships and the 2011 European U23 Championships.

Španović participated in the qualifying round at the 2008 Olympic Games, and was a finalist at the 2012 Olympic Games.

In 2013, she started at the European Indoor Championship when she was ranked fifth. At the World outdoor championship she had achieved the best result in her career by then, bronze medal with the new national record 6.82 meters. The Olympic Committee of Serbia therefore declared her the best female athlete of the year.

In 2014, she won the bronze medal at the World Indoor Championships and silver medals at the European Outdoor championship and IAAF Continental Cup in Marrakesh. She also improved her outdoor personal best on 6.88 meters in the Diamond League meet in Eugene.
Španović was second in long jump at 2014 Diamond League race.

In 2015, she won her first gold medal as a senior athlete becoming European indoor champion with new national record 6.98 meters. She won the second bronze medal at the World outdoor championship, improving her national record twice, both in qualification (6.91) and the final (7.01 got twice). Španović was second in long jump at 2015 Diamond League race. The Olympic Committee of Serbia therefore declared her the best female athlete of the year for the second time.

In 2016, during the indoor season, Španović won the silver medal at the World Indoor Championships improving her national record twice,
7.00 (at first round) and 7.07 (at fifth round). She was ahead for all the competition but she lost the gold medal because Reese had a fantastic 7.22 at the final round. During the outdoor, first Španović won the gold at the European Outdoor championship with 6.94, then she won the bronze medal at the Olympic Games with 7.08, new national record. Španović won for Serbia a medal in athletics at Olympic Games 60 years after the last medal. Španović clearly won 2016 Diamond League race in long jump. She won 5 of 7 meetings (a new record for Diamond League in long jump because before her none won more than 4 meetings in a year) and she was second in the other two ones. At the end of her long season, Španović improved her national record to 7.10 in a street meeting in front of her home fans in Belgrade on September 11. This manifestation was held to promote 2017 European Indoor Championships in Belgrade.

In 2017, she had an impressive win at European indoor championships in Belgrade. During the qualification she achieved
the best ever indoor mark in a qualification round with 7.03. In the final she broke her national records twice, 7.16 (at second round) and 7.24
(at third round). So, she defended her gold medal got in 2015. Her new national record, 7.24, put her as the third all-time indoor performers, and
result is the second best ever jumped in the European Indoor Championships (after Drechsler's 7.30 in 1988) and the best performance got in the latest 18 years, since Chistyakova has jumped 7.30 on 28.01.1989. During the outdoor season, she had injuries so before the World outdoor championships she competed only in two Diamond League meetings. She led in the first part of the competition, but she was only 4th before her last attempt.  With her final jump Spanović seemed to land beyond the 7.02 mark of the leading, Brittney Reese, and tensely awaited the measurement but it was recorded only as 6.91. The Serbian team appealed but in slow motion replays it showed that maybe the indentation in the sand nearest to the board was made by the flapping bib number on her back. Her coach Obradović saw VDM images (the system used for measuring horizontal jumps)  but according to him it was not clear if the possible mark was result of a bib contact or just of unevenly flattened sand. So she was only 4th with 6.96, behind Reese’s 7.02, Klishina’s 7.00 and Bartoletta’s 6.97. After World Championships Spanović won 2017 Diamond League race in long jump for the second consecutive time.

In 2018 she achieved the first world title, winning the World Indoor Championships in Birmingham with 6.96. Reese was 2nd with 6.89 and Moguenara 3rd with 6.85. Španović is the first Serbian athlete to win a world senior title in athletics.
After Španović won the gold medal at the Mediterranean Games in Tarragona with the Games record (7.04 windy and 6.99 regular), she got
the best performance in the qualification at European Championships in Berlin. But an injury during the qualification forced her to give up the final and to defend her title. Her 6.84 got in qualification was better than the performance got by Mihambo (6.75) to win the gold medal, so it was the best result in the competition.
The injury at Achille's tendon forced Španović to give up the final part of the season, included 2018 Diamond League race in which she qualified for the final.

In 2019 Španović, recovered by the injury of the previous summer, won gold medal at European indoor championships in Glasgow with 6.99. She matched the world indoor leading mark of 6.99 to emulate Heike Drechsler (1986–1988) as a three times in a row winner, but she got it in editions held every two years (2015–2017–2019). During the summer Španović had various injuries, including the one at ISTAF Berlin meeting, and was forced to forfeit the World Championships in Doha.

In 2020, Španović, bothered by a metatarsal bone fracture in June, decided to end her season already in August. She planned to compete at the European Indoor Championships next year, but not at the World Indoor Championships two weeks later. During the year, she had only one competition 6.80/0.8 long jump on June 6 in Novi Sad.

In 2021, Španović injured her right leg in the last training before leaving to Toruń and was forced to skip European indoor championships in which she was trying for the record, fourth successive title in it. Recovered by the injury, in the outdoor season, she had two successes in the 2021 Diamond League race at the Golden Gala in Firenze and at the DN Galan in Stockholm and one second place at Bislett Games in Oslo, before competing in Olympic Games.
In Olympic Games she got the best performance in the qualification (7.00), measure which would have allowed her to win the gold medal in the final. But she jumped only 6.91 in the final and she was fourth.
After the disappointment of the Olympic Games, Španović had another success in the 2021 Diamond League race at the Athletissima in Lausanne. At least 
she had a success in Weltklasse Zürich, final of 2021 Diamond League race, with a result of 6.96. So she won for the third time the long jump in the Diamond League, the most winning in this event.

In 2022, Španović-Vuleta retained her title at the World Indoor Championships. She won the World Indoor Championships with 7.06, the best performance of the 2022 indoor season. She gained the fourth consecutive medal in the event: bronze in 2014, silver in 2016, gold in 2018 and 2022. After a disappointing 7th place at World outdoor championships in Eugene, but with a millimeter foul, enough for a medal, she had a brilliant final of the season. First she won the gold medal at European Championships in Munich with a 7.06 jump, the best one in European Championships from 1998. She  achieved 7.06 at the first attempt and it was the first jump over 7.00 at European Championships in the 21th century. After her 7th gold medal at the major championships, Španović-Vuleta won the final of 2022 Diamond League race in Weltklasse Zürich, with a result of 6.97, once again got on the first jump. So she won for the fourth time the long jump in the Diamond League, the most winning in this event. The Olympic Committee of Serbia therefore declared her the best female athlete of the year for the third time.

Španović has achieved seventeen victories in the IAAF Diamond League circuit, a record in women long jump: at the DN Galan in 2013 (although in that year women long jump were not present in the Diamond League program of the meeting); at the Prefontaine Classic and Weltklasse Zürich in 2014; at the Herculis and Weltklasse Zürich in 2015; at the Shanghai Golden Grand Prix, at the Bislett Games, at the DN Galan, at the Athletissima and at Meeting Areva in 2016; at the Athletissima and at Memorial Van Damme, final of the Diamond League in 2017; at the Golden Gala, at the DN Galan, at the Athletissima, at the Weltklasse Zürich, final of the Diamond League in 2021; at the Weltklasse Zürich, final of the Diamond League in 2022. Also, she has achieved two victories in the IAAF World Challenge circuit,  at the ISTAF Berlin in 2015 and at the Hanžeković Memorial with 6.96, new meeting record, in 2016.

Since 2013 World Championships Španović has won 13 medals in major championships. 

She set 30 national senior records: 12 outdoors (all in long jump), 18 indoors (16 in long jump, 1 in 60m, 1 in pentathlon).

Personal bests

Outdoor

Indoor

International competitions

1Did not start in the final

Honours
 Order of Karađorđe's Star
 Order of Njegoš

Personal life
Ivana's parents are Ljubiša and Vesna Španović. Her mother was also a competitive athlete. She favors a distinctive and playful personal style.  Even on the field she can be seen fiercely competing with her fellow elite athletes while sporting fashionable nails, often polished in neon colours.

Španović married fitness nutritionist Marko Vuleta in September 2021. She officially adopted her husband's last name upon marriage.

References

External links

 
 
 
 
 

1990 births
Living people
Sportspeople from Zrenjanin
Serbian female long jumpers
Olympic athletes of Serbia
Athletes (track and field) at the 2008 Summer Olympics
Athletes (track and field) at the 2012 Summer Olympics
Athletes (track and field) at the 2016 Summer Olympics
World Athletics Championships athletes for Serbia
European Athletics Championships winners
World Athletics Championships medalists
Olympic bronze medalists for Serbia
Medalists at the 2016 Summer Olympics
Olympic bronze medalists in athletics (track and field)
European champions for Serbia
Universiade medalists in athletics (track and field)
Athletes (track and field) at the 2018 Mediterranean Games
Mediterranean Games gold medalists for Serbia
Mediterranean Games medalists in athletics
Universiade gold medalists for Serbia
World Athletics Indoor Championships winners
Diamond League winners
Mediterranean Games gold medalists in athletics
Medalists at the 2009 Summer Universiade
European Athletics Indoor Championships winners
Athletes (track and field) at the 2020 Summer Olympics